Yekaterina Igorevna Ananina (also romanized Ananyina; born 13 June 1991) is a Russian ice hockey forward, currently playing with SKIF Nizhny Novgorod of the Zhenskaya Hockey League (ZhHL).

International career
Ananina was selected for the Russia national women's ice hockey team in the 2010 Winter Olympics. She played in all five games, but did not record a point.

Ananina has also appeared for Russia at three IIHF Women's World Championships. Her first appearance came in 2009. She was a member of the team that won a bronze medal at the 2013 IIHF Women's World Championship.

She also competed in two junior tournaments for the Russia women's national under-18 ice hockey team, in the inaugural event in 2008 and in 2009.

Career statistics

International career

References

External links
 
 
 

1991 births
Living people
Ice hockey players at the 2010 Winter Olympics
Olympic ice hockey players of Russia
Sportspeople from Yekaterinburg
Russian women's ice hockey forwards
Universiade medalists in ice hockey
Universiade gold medalists for Russia
Universiade silver medalists for Russia
Competitors at the 2013 Winter Universiade
Competitors at the 2015 Winter Universiade
HC SKIF players
HC Agidel Ufa players
Belye Medvedi Chelyabinsk players